Mirabad (also Romanized as Mīrābād) is a Kurdish village in Solduz Rural District, in the Central District of Naqadeh County, West Azerbaijan Province, Iran. At the 2006 census, its population was 345, in 72 families.

References 

Populated places in Naqadeh County